Jean Collas (3 July 1874 in Paris – 30 December 1928 in Asnières-sur-Seine, France) was a French rugby union player and tug of war competitor, who competed in the 1900 Summer Olympics. He was a member of the French rugby union team, which won the gold medal. He also participated in the tug of war competition and won a silver medal as a member of the French team.

References

External links

1874 births
1928 deaths
Rugby union players from Paris
French rugby union players
Rugby union players at the 1900 Summer Olympics
Tug of war competitors at the 1900 Summer Olympics
Olympic rugby union players of France
Olympic tug of war competitors of France
Olympic gold medalists for France
Olympic silver medalists for France
Olympic medalists in tug of war
Medalists at the 1900 Summer Olympics